Palumbia simulans is a species of hoverfly in the family Syrphidae.

Distribution
Java, Laos, Sumatra.

References

Eristalinae
Insects described in 1914
Diptera of Asia
Taxa named by Johannes C. H. de Meijere